Ulk (1932–1942) was a Great Dane owned by Chilean President Arturo Alessandri during his second presidency. Eventually Ulk became the symbol of his government, appearing in numerous photographs of the epoch. Ulk is remembered in various anecdotes about the government of Alessandri. Allegedly, Ulk once stepped in while a diplomat was offering his credentials to the president and rose on two legs and licked the diplomat in the face.

See also
Reichshund, the Great Danes of Otto von Bismarck

References

Individual dogs in politics
1932 animal births
1942 animal deaths
Dogs in Chile